Salar de Uyuni (or "Salar de Tunupa") is the world's largest salt flat, or playa, at over  in area.

The Salar was formed as a result of transformations between several prehistoric lakes that existed around forty thousand years ago but had all evaporated over time. It is now covered by a few meters of salt crust, which has an extraordinary flatness with the average elevation variations within one meter over the entire area of the Salar. The crust serves as a source of salt and covers a pool of brine, which is exceptionally rich in lithium. The large area, clear skies, and exceptional flatness of the surface make the Salar ideal for calibrating the altimeters of Earth observation satellites.

The Salar serves as the major transport route across the Bolivian Altiplano and is a prime breeding ground for several species of flamingos. Salar de Uyuni is also a climatological transitional zone since the towering tropical cumulus congestus and cumulonimbus incus clouds that form in the eastern part of the salt flat during the summer cannot permeate beyond its drier western edges, near the Chilean border and the Atacama Desert.

The Salar has been used as a filming location for movies such as Star Wars: The Last Jedi (2017; as planet Crait), The Fall (2006), Salt and Fire (2016), The Unseen (2017), and several others.

Formation, geology, and climate

Salar de Uyuni is part of the Altiplano of Bolivia in South America. The Altiplano is a high plateau, which was formed during uplift of the Andes mountains. The plateau includes fresh and saltwater lakes as well as salt flats and is surrounded by mountains with no drainage outlets.

History

The geological history of the Salar is associated with a sequential transformation between several vast lakes. Some 30,000 to 42,000 years ago, the area was part of a giant prehistoric lake, Lake Minchin. Its age was estimated by radiocarbon dating shells from outcropping sediments and carbonate reefs and varies between reported studies. The youngest prehistoric lake was Coipasa, which was radiocarbon dated to 11,500 to 13,400 years ago. When it dried, it left behind two modern lakes, Poopó and Uru Uru, and two major salt deserts, Salar de Coipasa and the larger Salar de Uyuni. Salar de Uyuni spreads over 10,582 km2, which is roughly 100 times the size of the Bonneville Salt Flats in the United States. Lake Poopó is a neighbor of the much larger Lake Titicaca. During the wet season, Titicaca overflows and discharges into Poopó, which in turn, floods Salar De Coipasa and Salar de Uyuni.

Lacustrine mud that is interbedded with salt and saturated with brine underlies the surface of Salar de Uyuni. The brine is a saturated solution of sodium chloride, lithium chloride, and magnesium chloride in water. It is covered with a solid salt crust varying in thickness between tens of centimeters and a few meters. The center of the Salar contains a few islands, which are the remains of the tops of ancient volcanoes submerged during the era of Lake Minchin. They include unusual and fragile coral-like structures and deposits that often consist of fossils and algae.

Climate

The relative humidity is rather low and constant throughout the year at 30% to 45%. However, except for January, even in the rainy season the number of rainy days is fewer than 5 per month.

Economic influence

Located in the Lithium Triangle, the Salar contains a large amount of sodium, potassium, lithium and magnesium (all in the chloride forms of NaCl, KCl, LiCl and MgCl2, respectively), as well as borax. With an estimated 9,000,000 t, Bolivia holds about 7% of the world's known lithium resources; most of those are in the Salar de Uyuni.

Lithium is concentrated in the brine under the salt crust at a relatively high concentration of about 0.3%. It is also present in the top layers of the porous halite body lying under the brine; however, the liquid brine is easier to extract, by boring into the crust and pumping out the brine. The brine distribution has been monitored by the Landsat satellite and confirmed in ground drilling tests. Following those findings, an American-based international corporation has invested $137 million to developing lithium extraction. However, lithium extraction in the 1980s and 1990s by foreign companies met strong opposition from the local community. Locals believed that the money infused by mining would not reach them. The lithium in the salt flats contains more impurities, and the wet climate and high altitude make it harder to process.

No mining plant is currently at the site, and the Bolivian government does not want to allow exploitation by foreign corporations. Instead, it intends to reach an annual production of 35,000 t by 2023 in a joint venture with ACI Systems Alemania GmbH.

Salar de Uyuni is estimated to contain 10 billion tonnes (9.8 billion long tons; 11 billion short tons) of salt, of which less than 25,000 t is extracted annually. All miners working in the Salar belong to Colchani's cooperative. Because of its location, large area, and flatness, the Salar is a major car transport route across the Bolivian Altiplano, except when seasonally covered with water.

Name
Salar means salt flat in Spanish. Uyuni originates from the Aymara language and means a pen (enclosure); Uyuni is a surname and the name of a town that serves as a gateway for tourists visiting the Salar. Thus Salar de Uyuni can be loosely translated as a salt flat with enclosures, the latter possibly referring to the "islands" of the Salar; or as "salt-flat at Uyuni (the town named 'pen for animals')".

Aymara legend tells that the mountains Tunupa, Kusku, and Kusina, which surround the Salar, were giant people. Tunupa married Kusku, but Kusku ran away from her with Kusina. Grieving Tunupa started to cry while breastfeeding her son. Her tears mixed with milk and formed the Salar. Many locals consider the Tunupa an important deity and say that the place should be called Salar de Tunupa rather than Salar de Uyuni.

Flora and fauna

The Salar is virtually devoid of any wildlife or vegetation. The latter is dominated by giant cacti (Echinopsis atacamensis pasacana, Echinopsis tarijensis, etc.). Other shrubs include Pilaya, which is used by locals to cure catarrh, and Thola (Baccharis dracunculifolia), which is burned as a fuel. Also present are quinoa plants and queñua bushes.

Every November, Salar de Uyuni is the breeding ground for three South American species of flamingo feeding on local brine shrimps: the Chilean, Andean, and rare James's flamingos. About 80 other bird species are present, including the horned coot, Andean goose, and Andean hillstar. The Andean fox, or culpeo, is also present, and islands in the Salar (in particular Incahuasi Island) host colonies of rabbit-like viscachas.

Tourism

Hotels

Salar de Uyuni is a popular tourist destination, and consequently a number of hotels have been built in the area. Due to lack of conventional construction materials, many of them are almost entirely (walls, roof, furniture) built with salt blocks cut from the Salar. The first such hotel, named Palacio de Sal, was erected in 1993–1995 in the middle of the salt flat, and soon became a popular tourist destination. However, its location in the center of a desert caused sanitation problems, as most waste had to be collected manually. Mismanagement caused serious environmental pollution and the hotel had to be dismantled in 2002.

Around 2007, a new hotel was built, under the name Palacio de Sal, in a new location 
at the eastern edge of Salar de Uyuni, 25 km away from the town of Uyuni. The sanitary system has been restructured to comply with the government regulations. The hotel has a dry sauna and a steam room, a saltwater pool and whirlpool baths.

Train cemetery
One major tourist attraction is an antique train cemetery. It is  outside Uyuni and is connected to it by the old train tracks. The town served in the past as a distribution hub for the trains carrying minerals en route to Pacific Ocean ports. The rail lines were built by British engineers arriving near the end of the 19th century and formed a sizeable community in Uyuni. The engineers were invited by the British-sponsored Antofagasta and Bolivia Railway Companies, now Ferrocarril de Antofagasta a Bolivia. The rail construction started in 1888 and ended in 1892. It was encouraged by Bolivian President Aniceto Arce, who believed Bolivia would flourish with a good transport system, but it was also constantly sabotaged by the local Aymara indigenous Indians who saw it as an intrusion into their lives. The trains were mostly used by the mining companies. In the 1940s, the mining industry collapsed, partly because of mineral depletion. Many trains were abandoned, producing the train cemetery. There are proposals to build a museum from the cemetery.

Accidents
Unfortunately, accidents are not uncommon in the salt flats. Poorly maintained vehicles, untrained drivers, speeding, disregard for poor conditions, and the lack of regulation for tour companies continues to occur despite many fatal accidents.

Satellite calibration
Salt flats are ideal for calibrating the distance measurement equipment of satellites because they are large, stable surfaces with strong reflection, similar to that of ice sheets. As the largest salt flat on Earth, Salar de Uyuni is especially suitable for this purpose. It has a stable surface, smoothed by seasonal flooding — water dissolves the salt surface and thus keeps it leveled.

As a result, the variation in the surface elevation over the  area of Salar de Uyuni is less than  normal to the Earth's circumference, and there are few square kilometers on Earth that are as flat. The surface reflectivity (albedo) for ultraviolet light is relatively high at 0.69 and shows variations of only a few percent during the daytime. The combination of all these features makes Salar de Uyuni about five times better for satellite calibration than the surface of an ocean. Using Salar de Uyuni as the target, ICESat has already achieved the short-term elevation measurement accuracy of below .

By using data from MISR to perform passive optical bathymetry when the flat is flooded and calibrating the resultant water depth model with topographical data from the laser altimeter of ICESat, it has been shown that the Salar de Uyuni is not perfectly flat.  The 2006 analysis revealed previously missed features: ridges between 20 and 30 centimetres in height that are roughly sinusoidal with a wavelength of 5 km (clearly visible in 1973 and 1975 LandSat images, and still in the same places decades later), and a moat around the periphery that is 1–3 km wide and 20 to 50 cm deep. They originate from the variation in material density, and thus the gravitational force, beneath the Salar's sediments. Just as the ocean surface rises over denser seamounts, the salt flat surface also rises and falls to reflect the subsurface density variations.

Gallery

See also 
 Ouki
 Puka Mayu
 Great Salt Lake
 Rann of Kutch

References

External links

 
Salar de Uyuni official website

Uyuni
Landforms of Oruro Department
Landforms of Potosí Department
Endorheic lakes of South America
Tourist attractions in Oruro Department
Tourist attractions in Potosí Department
Altiplano